Badoc, officially the Municipality of Badoc, is a 3rd class municipality in the province of Ilocos Norte, Philippines. According to the 2020 census, it has a population of 32,530 people.

It is the birthplace of Filipino painter, Juan Luna. The tourist spots in this town are Luna Shrine, Luna Park, Badoc Island, Badoc Church and La Virgin Milagrosa Shrine and beautiful beaches.

Geography
It is also the westernmost municipality in Ilocos Norte.

Barangays
Badoc is politically subdivided into 31 barangays. These barangays are headed by elected officials: Barangay Captain, Barangay Council, whose members are called Barangay Councilors. All are elected every three years.

Climate

Demographics

Economy

Places of interest

La Virgen Milagrosa
Badoc houses the Sanctuary of the Miraculous Statue of the Blessed Virgin Mary, the La Virgen Milagrosa. History traces the life-sized statue to Nagasaki, Japan. It was sent floating in the sea by missionaries operating in secret in Japan (for fear of persecution during the Tokugawa Bakufu), along with the Miraculous Statue of the Black Nazarene (Sinait's Santo Cristo Milagroso). It was first found by local fishermen in the shores of Barangay Dadalaquiten of Sinait, Ilocos Sur and Barangay Paguetpet of Badoc (on the present-day boundary between Ilocos Norte and Ilocos Sur) in the year 1620. Only fishermen from Sinait were able to move the Statue of the Black Nazarene. The fishermen from Badoc, unable to move the Black Nazarene, were able to move the La Virgen Milagrosa that came with it—which was, in turn, unable to be moved by the fishermen from Sinait. They took the statues to their respective towns, hence becoming their patron saints.  Today The La Virgen Milagrosa is enshrined at the Badoc Church, as Barangay Paguetpet was renamed in honor of the La Virgen Milagrosa.  A chapel was erected near the site where the image landed, which is a stone's throw from the chapel marking the landing site of the Santo Cristo Milagroso.

Juan Luna Shrine

The Juan Luna Shrine is the reconstructed two storey ancestral house of the painter Juan Luna, the revolutionary general Antonio Luna, and the violinist Manuel Luna. Built in the typical middle class fashion, the house was burned down in 1861 and was rebuilt using clay bricks and molave wood. Now a museum, the shrine houses photos of the Luna family and reproductions of Luna's paintings. The second floor retains the living room, bedrooms, azotea, and chapel, all furnished with period furniture and accessories.

Minor Basilica of Saint John the Baptist

Also known as Badoc Basilica, St. John the Baptist Parish Church was constructed in 1591 and was once a chapel under the jurisdiction of Sinait. It was formally recognized as a parish in 1714 with St. John the Baptist as patron saint. The baroque church made of stone blocks and brick tiles is credited to Reverend Father Valentin Blovide. It was occupied by the Sambals during the revolution headed by Andres Malong in 1660–61.

The celebrated Philippine painter Juan Luna was baptized in Badoc Church on 27 October 1857. At present, the church houses the miraculous statue of the Blessed Virgin Mary venerated under the title Virgin of Miracles, crowned by Catholic bishops in 1980, and was granted a Canonical coronation by Pope Francis on 31 May 2018. On November 30, 2018, the parish was elevated to the level of a Minor Basilica. The elevation rites took place on February 5, 2019.

Government
Badoc, belonging to the second congressional district of the province of Ilocos Norte, is governed by a mayor designated as its local chief executive and by a municipal council as its legislative body in accordance with the Local Government Code. The mayor, vice mayor, and the councilors are elected directly by the people through an election which is being held every three years.

Elected officials

References

External links

Official Website of Badoc, Ilocos Norte
Badoc Information Guide - Badoc Municipal Officials
 [ Philippine Standard Geographic Code]
Philippine Census Information
Local Governance Performance Management System

Municipalities of Ilocos Norte